Bryan Rennie may refer to:
 Bryan Rennie (historian)
 Bryan Rennie (rugby union)